Noel Scott  (15 December 1929 – 25 February 2018) was a New Zealand politician of the Labour Party.

Biography

Before entering politics, Scott was the foundation principal of Makoura College in Masterton. He represented the electorate of Tongariro in Parliament from 1984 to 1990, when he was defeated by Ian Peters, one of a number of losses contributing to the fall of the Fourth Labour Government.

Scott served as a Minister at the close of the Fourth Labour Government in a number of roles including as Minister for Sport and Recreation and Associate Minister of Education.

In the 2002 Queen's Birthday and Golden Jubilee Honours, Scott was appointed a Companion of the Queen's Service Order for public services.

Scott died on 25 February 2018 at the age of 88.

References

1929 births
2018 deaths
New Zealand schoolteachers
New Zealand Labour Party MPs
Members of the New Zealand House of Representatives
New Zealand MPs for North Island electorates
Unsuccessful candidates in the 1981 New Zealand general election
Unsuccessful candidates in the 1990 New Zealand general election
Companions of the Queen's Service Order